The Greatest Love of All (also known as The Greatest Love in the World) is a 2006 Brazilian romantic drama film directed by Carlos Diegues. Filming took place in 60 locations in Rio de Janeiro.

Plot
The film follows Antônio (José Wilker), an astrophysicist who lived most of his life in the United States, as he returns to Brazil in demand for their origin and their biological parents. In Brazil, Antônio becomes aware he suffers from a serious illness, whilst he falls in love for Antônia (Taís Araújo), a suburb's girl.

Cast
José Wilker as Antônio
Max Fercondini as young Antônio
Taís Araújo as Luciana
Sérgio Britto as maestro
Marco Ricca as young maestro
Léa Garcia as Zezé
Anna Sophia Folch as Girl
Hugo Carvana as Salvador
Clara Carvalho as Sônia
Deborah Evelyn as Carolina
Sérgio Malheiros as Mosca
Sílvio Guindane as Dabé
Erika Mader as Pit

Reception
It shared the Grand Prize of the Americas, the top prize at the 30th Montreal World Film Festival, with Eiji Okuda's A Long Walk. It also won the Young Europeans Jury Award of the 2006 Biarritz Film Festival, Best Music Award of the 28th Havana Film Festival, and Special Mention Award of the 24th Mar del Plata Film Festival.

References

External links

2006 romantic drama films
2006 films
Brazilian romantic drama films
Films directed by Carlos Diegues
Films shot in Rio de Janeiro (city)
2000s Portuguese-language films